Sheryfa Luna (born Chérifa Babouche; 25 January 1989) is a French R&B singer born to an Algerian-Kabyle father and a French mother.

She won the fourth series of the French edition of popular Popstars in October 2007.
Her self-titled debut album  peaked at No. 3 in France and was certified Gold there.

She has released three singles: "Quelque part" (Somewhere) and "Il avait les mots" (He Had the Words), which both went to No. 1 in France, and "D'ici et D'Ailleurs" (From Here and Elsewhere) which was released in March 2008.

Luna gave birth to a son, Vénus Junior, on 14 February 2008.

Discography

Album

Singles 

Featured in

References

External links
Official website
Official blog
Persian-English Fan blog
 Persian forum

1989 births
Living people
People from Évreux
Popstars winners
Kabyle people
French people of Kabyle descent
21st-century French singers
21st-century French women singers